The Constitutional Charter of Serbia and Montenegro (Ustavna povelja Srbije i Crne Gore) came into force on 4 February 2003, creating a confederacy between Serbia and Montenegro under one government, the State Union of Serbia and Montenegro amending the earlier Federal Constitution.

See also
1992 Yugoslav Constitution
Constitution of Montenegro
Constitution of Serbia
Serbia and Montenegro

External links
Declaration on Relations with the Republic of Serbia after gaining Independence
Full text from Serbian government (PDF, 187KB).

Government of Serbia and Montenegro
2003 in Serbia and Montenegro
Serbia and Montenegro
Serbia and Montenegro law
2003 in law
February 2003 events in Europe